That '70s Show is an American television period teen sitcom that aired on Fox from August 23, 1998, to May 18, 2006. The series focuses on the lives of a group of six teenage friends living in the fictional town of Point Place, Wisconsin, from May 17, 1976, to December 31, 1979.

The main teenage cast members were Topher Grace, Mila Kunis, Ashton Kutcher, Danny Masterson, Laura Prepon, Wilmer Valderrama, and Lisa Robin Kelly. The main adult cast members were Debra Jo Rupp, Kurtwood Smith, Don Stark, Tommy Chong, and Tanya Roberts.

In 1999, the show was remade for the ITV network in the United Kingdom as Days Like These using almost verbatim scripts with minor changes to cultural references. A sequel series, That '90s Show, set in 1995 and focusing on the children of the main characters of That '70s Show, was released on Netflix on January 19, 2023.

Cast
{{Main|List of That '70s and '90s Show characters|l1=List of That '70s, and 90s Show characters}}

Young cast
Topher Grace as Eric Forman (seasons 1–7; special guest season 8): Eric is a nice person, physically slight and somewhat clumsy. He has a fast wit and a deadpan sense of humor. His obsession with movies, particularly Star Wars, is often referred to throughout the show. For seven seasons Eric is in a relationship with his longtime love and neighbor Donna Pinciotti. His father, Red, is always hard on him. He convinces his parents to let his best friend Steven Hyde move in with them, making Hyde like a brother. He decides to become a teacher after high school and he leaves the series at the end of the seventh season to teach in Africa. Although Eric is mentioned at least once in every episode, he does not appear during the final season until the end of the series finale.
Mila Kunis as Jackie Burkhart: The youngest member of the group, Jackie starts the series as the pretty, spoiled rich, selfish, oftentimes annoying immature girl. She likes to give thoughtless and superficial advice, which occasionally turns out to be correct. As the series progresses she becomes more genuine, after her father, a crooked politician, goes to jail and her fortunes take a reversal. Partly as a result of these changes, she and Donna become better friends. By the end of the series, Jackie had dated three of the four guys of the group: Kelso, Hyde and Fez.
Ashton Kutcher as Michael Kelso (seasons 1–7; special guest season 8): Kelso is the dumb pretty boy of the group, who hopes to coast through life on his good looks. He spends the first half of the series in a relationship with the equally vapid Jackie. Their relationship comes to an end when Laurie (Eric's older sister) reveals their affair to Jackie. Kelso fathers a daughter, named Betsy, from his relationship with a librarian named Brooke during the seventh season. He becomes a police officer, but is fired for utter incompetence. In the fourth episode of the eighth and final season, he becomes a security guard at a Chicago Playboy Club and leaves the show. Kelso, along with Eric, returns for the series finale.
Danny Masterson as Steven Hyde: Eric's best friend and the anti-establishment member of the group. By the end of season one, the Formans allow Hyde to move in after he was abandoned by his mother, making him a foster brother to Eric. Hyde has a witty, blunt and sarcastic sense of humor and a rebellious personality. He is also experienced and the other group members often ask for his advice. Although Hyde dates Jackie for three seasons, in the final season he marries an exotic dancer named Samantha. Hyde later discovers Samantha was married to another man when she married him. As Donna points out in "My Fairy King", that means Hyde and Samantha are not legally married. In the seventh season, Hyde meets his biological father (William Barnett, played by Tim Reid), a wealthy black businessman (making Hyde, who was presumed white, biracial). Barnett, who owns a chain of record stores, makes Hyde first an office worker, then a manager and later the owner of the Point Place record store. He also previously worked for Leo in a Photo Hut earlier in the series.
Laura Prepon as Donna Pinciotti: Eric's longtime girlfriend (and briefly fiancée) who is literally and figuratively "the girl next door". Donna is tall, intelligent, good-looking and athletic. Donna is embarrassed by her parents' escapades – especially sexual ones. Although she does not agree with what Jackie represents in the beginning of the series, they become friends. Donna is in a relationship with Eric for seven seasons (despite their break-up during season 4). She has brief romances with Randy and Kelso's brother Casey. She rekindles her relationship with Eric at the end of the show's finale.
Wilmer Valderrama as Fez: The horny foreign exchange student of the group whose hormones are usually out of control. He constantly flirts with Jackie and Donna and often makes romantic advances toward them. Initially, he has trouble getting attention from girls, but during the eighth season he becomes a ladies' man. He is in love with Jackie throughout the series but his love is not reciprocated until the eighth season when they become a couple. His home country is often referenced throughout the course of the show, but is never named specifically. 
He is introduced in the final season. Randy appears laid back, gentle, polite and a ladies' man, although many of his flaws surface later, encompassing parts of the departed Kelso and Eric's personalities and other attributes. Tall (like Kelso), he tends to spout witty one-liners (like Eric), and makes silly voices. He forms a friendship with Red after showing Red how good he is at fixing things. While Hyde, Jackie, Donna and Kelso embrace him as a new member of their group, Fez initially does not, but soon warms up to him. Randy dates Donna for the majority of season eight, but she later breaks up with him. The two end on good terms and remain friends. He makes a brief appearance in the series finale.

Older cast
Debra Jo Rupp as Kitty Forman: Red's wife and mother of Eric and Laurie, and Hyde's informally adoptive mother, Kitty is a cheerful, doting mother, but can also be assertive when pushed. A  nurse by profession, she drinks heavily and is a former smoker. Her major mood swings are usually attributed to menopause, although the lack of affection and attention from her daughter (Laurie) and her mother (Bea) is also partly to blame. She is also a nurturing mother figure to Eric's rather dysfunctional friends, especially Fez.
Kurtwood Smith as Red Forman: Kitty's husband, father of Eric and Laurie, and Hyde's adoptive father. A conservative Navy combat veteran, he served in World War II and the Korean War. He is frequently hard on Eric and casually insults him, often calling him “dumbass”. Despite his mean exterior, Red also displays a soft side. His hobbies include working with his power tools, drinking beer, watching television, reading the newspaper, hunting and fishing.
Lisa Robin Kelly (seasons 2–3; recurring season 1; special appearance season 5) and Christina Moore (recurring season 6) as : Eric's manipulative and dishonest older sister. She flunked out of college during the first season and moves back home with her parents. Laurie enjoys tormenting Eric and manipulating her parents. She is promiscuous, often seen with various men, mainly Eric's friend Kelso, who cheats on his girlfriend Jackie. Eric, Hyde and Donna often insult her for her promiscuity. She also has a strained relationship with her mother who thinks of her as a freeloader. She leaves the series during the third season, but returns in a recurring role during the fifth and sixth seasons. In season five, she marries Fez to prevent him from getting deported. She leaves the series part way through season 6 and is never seen again. During the seventh season, she is mentioned as having moved to Canada, where, as Eric puts it drolly, "bottomless dancing is legal".
Tanya Roberts as Midge Pinciotti (seasons 1–3; special guest appearance seasons 6–7): Bob's wife, Donna's mother, and Kitty's best friend, Midge is a woman about whom Eric and his male friends fantasize when coming of age. Although often dim-witted, she later adopts some feminist ideals. She is written out of the series in 2001 after the third season after divorcing Bob and moving to California, but returns in a limited guest appearance during the sixth and seventh seasons.
Don Stark as Bob Pinciotti: Midge's husband and Donna's father. Bob often brags about his service in the National Guard, which invariably irritates Red, a veteran of foreign wars. Bob is known for walking around his house with his robe wide open and no underwear. He eats constantly, even in bed. Bob is almost always in a good mood. His best friend is Red, who usually considers him to be a nuisance. He usually takes the brunt of Red's abuse in a jolly manner. After Midge divorced Bob in the fourth season, he began dating Joanne (in seasons four and five) and Pam Burkhart (played by Brooke Shields replacing Eve Plumb from the first season), Jackie's mother (in seasons six and seven).
Tommy Chong as Leo (seasons 4 & 8; special guest seasons 2–3 & 7): A hippie, and the owner of a Foto Hut at which Hyde once worked, Leo is an Army veteran who served in World War II, where he was awarded a Purple Heart. Leo often puts play before work and maintains an easy-going attitude in most things, business included. He disappears during season four, but is later referenced in season five's "The Battle of Evermore" when the gang goes on a mission to find him, but with no luck. He returns in season seven and remains on the series until the show's end. In Season 8, he gets a new job working for Hyde at Grooves.

Episodes

Timeline

The show was set in May 1976 in the August 23, 1998, premiere. After 12 episodes, the series transitioned to 1977. The 23rd episode, "Grandma's Dead", was also set in 1976, because it was supposed to be the season finale of season 1. The show remained in 1977 for the next two seasons. Near the end of the third season, the series transitioned to 1978 until early in the sixth season. The remaining episodes took place in 1979, and the series finale abruptly ends during a New Year's Eve party as the characters reach "one" during a countdown to January 1, 1980. After the credits roll, the license plate from Eric's Vista Cruiser is shown with the year "80", indicating that the 1980s have begun.

Eighth season and series finale
The character of Eric Forman was written out of the series at the end of the seventh season, as Topher Grace wanted to move on with his career. Ashton Kutcher switched to a recurring guest role when he also chose to depart following the seventh season. However, Kelso had not been written out yet, so to give better closure to the character, Kutcher appeared in the first four episodes of the eighth season (credited as a special guest star). Both Grace and Kutcher would eventually return for the series finale, although the former was uncredited. Tommy Chong (who began reappearing by late season 7 after a long absence) became a regular again to help fill Kelso's role as the dimwit of the group. Eric was supposed to be replaced by his new friend Charlie, played by Bret Harrison, as an "innocent character", who proved fairly popular with audiences, but the character was killed off after Harrison was offered a lead role in the series The Loop. Another new character named Randy Pearson, played by Josh Meyers (brother of Late Night host Seth Meyers), was introduced to take the place of both Eric and, to a lesser extent, Charlie. Another new character, Samantha, a stripper played by Jud Tylor, was added as Hyde's wife for nine episodes. The location of the show's introductory theme song was changed from the Vista Cruiser to the circle.

The eighth season was announced as the final season of the show on January 17, 2006, and "That '70s Finale" was filmed a month later on February 17, 2006, first airing on May 18, 2006.

Production
Title
The working titles for the show were:Teenage Wasteland (named after the lyric from "Baba O'Riley" by The Who)The Kids Are Alright (named after "The Kids Are Alright" by The Who)Feelin' All Right (a Traffic & Joe Cocker song)Reeling in the Years (named after the song by Steely Dan)

However, due to song-rights refusals (including The Who's Pete Townshend) and Fox Network's deeming Feelin' All Right less than memorable, co-creator Bonnie Turner suggested that the show should be titled That '70s Show, after hearing an audience member saying "I loved that show about the '70s." It was at that point where it ultimately became the official title for the show.

Elements of the show
The 1970s
The show addressed social issues of the 1970s such as sexual attitudes, generational conflict, the economic hardships of the 1970s recession, mistrust of the American government by blue-collar workers, and underage drinking/teenage drug use. The series also highlighted developments in fashion trends, the entertainment industry, including the television remote ("the clicker"), reruns, VCR, and cable TV; the video games Pong and Space Invaders; the cassette tape and Disco; MAD magazine; and Eric's obsession with  Star Wars. The show has been compared to Happy Days, which was similarly set 20 years before the time in which it aired.

Beginning with season 5, each episode in the series is named after a song by a rock band that was famous in the 1970s: Led Zeppelin (season 5), The Who (Season 6), The Rolling Stones (season 7), and Queen (season 8, except for the finale, titled "That '70s Finale").

The circle

In the circle, a group of characters, usually the teenagers, sit in a circle (generally in Eric's basement, though occasionally elsewhere), as the camera pans, stopping at each character as they speak. It was usually apparent that the characters are under the influence of marijuana. Thick clouds of smoke, frequent coughing and an extreme wide-angle lens added to the "drug-induced" feel, although the audience never saw anyone actually smoking the plant. Also, no visible cannabis-related paraphernalia were seen, such as bongs or joint papers. Characters never spoke the word "marijuana" while in the circle (except in one episode "Reefer Madness"), often referring to it as "stuff" or a "stash". In the episode "Bye-Bye Basement", Theo (Leo's cousin) refers to "weed"; in "The Relapse", Kelso tells Fez that the concrete wall behind the gym is used mostly for "smoking weed and beating up freshmen;" in "Ski Trip" Kitty asks Eric why he is taking so much oregano to Jackie's ski lodge; in "Eric's Burger Job", Kelso blames his "roach clip" when the water bed pops on which he is sitting at a party; in two episodes ("That Wrestling Show" and "Hyde Moves In"), Eric and Hyde can be seen wearing shirts with the words "Cannabis sativa" written on a Campbell's soup can; and in "The Pill", Red, referring to Kelso, exclaims, "That kid's on dope!" A gimmick related to the circle and the marijuana smoking was Eric watching the kitchen wall moving erratically, although this technique was also used to show that Eric was drunk.

As the series progressed, the circle became one of the series' recurring features. The only four episodes where the whole gang is in the circle are "Class Picture", "I'm A Boy", "Substitute", and in the series finale. During the eighth and final season, the circle sans smoke replaced the Vista Cruiser as the setting of the opening credits.

The Vista Cruiser
Many of the show's episodes featured Eric and the rest of the kids in or around Eric's "Aztec Gold" 1969 Oldsmobile Vista Cruiser, handed down to Eric by Red. For the first seven seasons of the show, the show's introduction showed the cast inside the Vista Cruiser. The particular station wagon was bought by Wilmer Valderrama at the show's conclusion from Carsey-Werner for "no more than" US$500. The Vista Cruiser makes a brief appearance, in its original "That 70's Show" configuration, in the sequel series, That 90's Show.

In August 2009, the show's Vista Cruiser was named third-greatest television car ever by MSN Autos.

Running gags and catchphrases

In one of the show's major running gags, Red often threatens to punish Eric with many variations of the catchphrase, "my foot in your ass" or more generally "kicking your ass." For example, in "Kitty and Eric's Night Out", Red mistakenly thinks Eric offended Kitty, so Red says, "I swear I'll kick his ass!" In "Eric's Hot Cousin", Eric tries to get out of something by claiming he's sleepwalking and Red says, "And I'm about to be sleep-kicking your ass", and, in "Prank Day", when Red gets covered in oatmeal, Eric tries to explain that it was just a prank that had gone "horribly, horribly wrong" Red says, "Well, I have a prank, too. One where my foot doesn't plow through your ass. Let's hope it doesn't go horribly, horribly wrong!" In the eighth season, Hyde asks Red, "did you ever actually do that?"  To which Red replies "Once, during the war... I can't talk about it."  Several of the running gags were shown in edited clips for the series finale.

Some other notable running gags and catchphrases are:
 Fez's country of origin is never revealed. Sometimes, Fez is about to disclose where he is from, or at least hint at it, but something happens to prevent him from doing so, like someone entering the room as seen in "Stolen Car", or Fez rambling in "Love of My Life".
 Fez's real name was also never revealed. Even Fez stood for FES, Foreign Exchange Student. Red often calls Fez by some exotic foreign names when he is speaking directly to him, including Tarzan.
 Someone, usually Kelso, falls off the Water Tower. Charlie is the only one to fall off and die from the tower in "Bohemian Rhapsody" due to him having weak endurance.
 Kelso yells "Ow, my eye!" when Hyde rough-houses with him. For example, in the episode "Class Picture", a series of flashbacks feature Hyde beating up Kelso. While the two are out of the immediate sight of the audience, Kelso yells, "Ow, my eye!" and the scene cuts to the next flashback. This gag is repeated several times throughout the series, although the only time Kelso appears with an injured eye is in "Jackie's Cheese Squeeze" after he was punched by Todd, Jackie's manager. On that occasion, Kelso did not yell, "Ow, my eye!"
 Fez's sex life or usually lack thereof. Often Fez accidentally reveals some perverse behavior he performed, like hiding in Donna's room.
 The best thing to do or the best solution can be found by "The Circle", sometimes from the Circle, Hyde will start to talk about a car that runs on water or conspiracies towards the Government.
 Eric's attempted "secret" money stash locations are known by everyone, such as the Candy Land box.

In other media

Home mediaThat '70s Show was released on DVD in Regions 1, 2 and 4 by 20th Century Fox Home Entertainment at an increment of two seasons per year between 2004 and 2008 and a complete series release on October 14, 2008. Mill Creek Entertainment released all eight seasons between 2011–2013 and released a complete series set on May 14, 2013. On March 6, 2012, Mill Creek released the first season on Blu-ray and season two on October 16, 2012. On November 3, 2015, Mill Creek Entertainment released That '70s Show The Complete Series on Blu-ray 1080p, featuring all 200 episodes from the series, presented digitally remastered in High Definition from the original film negatives for optimum sound and video quality and for superior home entertainment Blu-ray presentation with remastered 5.1 DTS-HD Master Audio surround sound and 16:9 widescreen aspect ratio.

Soundtracks
Several prominent songs from the decade can be heard on the series, and two soundtracks were released in 1999. The first is a collection of funk, soul, and disco, called That '70s Album (Jammin'). The second is a collection of album-oriented rock songs, called That '70s Album (Rockin'). AllMusic gave both albums 3 out of 5 stars in their reviews.

 Remake 
 Days Like These 

 Related shows 
 That '80s Show That '80s Show was a similar decade-based show which, despite having a similar name, show structure, and many of the same writers and production staff, was not a direct spin-off, with the characters and story lines never crossing paths. It was created because of That '70s Show's popularity at the time.

 That '90s Show 

Netflix produced a spin-off of the series, titled That '90s Show, with Kurtwood Smith and Debra Jo Rupp reprising their roles as Red and Kitty Forman, respectively. It is again produced by The Carsey-Werner Company, with Gregg Mettler serving as showrunner and Bonnie Turner, Terry Turner, their daughter Lindsay Turner, Marcy Carsey, Tom Werner, Smith and Rupp as executive producers. Topher Grace (Eric Forman), Mila Kunis (Jackie Burkhart), Ashton Kutcher (Michael Kelso), Laura Prepon (Donna Pinciotti), Wilmer Valderrama (Fez), Tommy Chong (Leo), Don Stark (Bob Pinciotti), and Jim Rash (Fenton) reprised their roles as guest stars in the series. It  premiered on Netflix on January 19, 2023.

Reception

American ratings

Over the course of its run, the series was a consistent performer for Fox, becoming one of their flagship shows. Its eight seasons, consisting of 200 episodes, made it Fox's second-longest-running live-action sitcom ever behind Married... with Children, though That '70s Show'' did not have the same ratings success, despite surviving cancellation.

As of April 2020, the show went in syndication on FX, Freeform, Comedy Central, TeenNick, Pop, NickMom, IFC, Nick at Nite and TV Land. It can currently be seen on Laff.

Awards

Over the course of its run, the series was nominated for a substantial number of awards, including 16 Primetime Emmy Awards. The only win for the series at this event came in 1999, when Melina Root was awarded the Emmy for Outstanding Costume Design for a Series for "That Disco Episode". Additionally, the show was nominated for a large number of Teen Choice Awards, with both Ashton Kutcher and Wilmer Valderrama winning on three occasions.

References

External links

 
 

1998 American television series debuts
2006 American television series endings
1990s American teen sitcoms
2000s American teen sitcoms
American television series about cannabis
Coming-of-age television shows
English-language television shows
Fox Broadcasting Company original programming
History of the Green Bay Packers
Television series about teenagers
Television series by Carsey-Werner Productions
Television series by 20th Century Fox Television
Television series by Sony Pictures Television
Television series created by Bonnie and Terry Turner
Television series set in 1976
Television series set in 1977
Television series set in 1978
Television series set in 1979
Television series set in the 1970s
Television shows filmed in Los Angeles
Television shows set in Wisconsin
Nostalgia television shows
Nostalgia television in the United States
Television series created by Mark Brazill